The World Monuments Watch is a flagship advocacy program of the New York-based private non-profit organization World Monuments Fund (WMF) and American Express to call upon every government in the world, preservation organizations, and other groups and individuals to nominate sites and monuments that are particularly endangered. At the same time, the nominators commit themselves to participate in a carefully planned preservation project.

Selection process
Every two years, the program publishes a select list known as the Watch List of 100 Most Endangered Sites that is in urgent need of preservation funding and protection. The sites are chosen from these nominations by an independent panel of international experts, based on the significance of the site, the urgency of the problem, and the viability of the proposal for action. WMF would then publicize their plight and help find the resources and expertise to carry out the preservation projects for the 100 sites on the Watch List. The leverage from the listing also spurs government agencies and local donors to allocate funds and take an active role in protecting the cultural landmark, in addition to grants directly coming from WMF and American Express.

2000 Watch List
The 2000 World Monuments Watch List of 100 Most Endangered Sites was launched on 14 September 1999 by WMF President Bonnie Burnham.

List by country/territory

Statistics by country/territory
The following countries/territories have multiple sites entered on the 2000 Watch List, listed by the number of sites:

Notes

A. Numbers list only meant as a guide on this article. No official reference numbers have been designated for the sites on the Watch List.
B. Names and spellings used for the sites were based on the official 2000 Watch List as published.
C. The references to the sites' locations and periods of construction were based on the official Watch List as published.

References

External links
 World Monuments Fund home page
 World Monuments Watch home page

Historic preservation
2000 documents